Cychropsis namchabarwana is a species of ground beetle in the subfamily of Carabinae. It was described by Imura in 1999.

References

namchabarwana
Beetles described in 1999